Paweł Jan Tanajno (born December 19, 1975) is a Polish entrepreneur and politician.

He studied law at Nicolaus Copernicus University in Toruń and holds a degree in marketing. From 1995 to 2004 he ran a computer company Sferis. He was also a member of foundations and a member of board of three other companies. He works as internet marketing specialist.

From 2002 to 2003, Tanajno was a member of Civic Platform. He collaborated with Palikot's Movement but ended it due to financial inconsistencies in the party. He became a member of Direct Democracy in 2012 and served as party's spokesperson.

Tanajno was DB's candidate in May 2015 presidential election. He gained 29,785 votes (0,2% overall) which placed him at last eleventh position. He unsuccessfully ran for member of Sejm from Kukiz'15 list in October 2015.

References

External links
Campaign website

1975 births
Candidates in the 2015 Polish presidential election
Candidates in the 2020 Polish presidential election
Living people
Politicians from Warsaw
Businesspeople from Warsaw